Planina is a dispersed settlement in the hills north of Ljubno ob Savinji in Slovenia. The area belongs to the traditional region of Styria and is now included in the Savinja Statistical Region.

References

External links
Planina on Geopedia

Populated places in the Municipality of Ljubno